Culture Vultures is a second and final album by American band Orson. The album was released on October 22, 2007 but it leaked online on October 20, 2007.

The album did not follow the success of their debut, 'Bright Idea', which charted at #1 on the UK Album Chart, and only reached a position of #25 in its debut week. "Ain't No Party", the lead single, only peaked at #21, failing to repeat the success of the lead single off their previous album, "No Tomorrow", which charted at #1. The album sold 8020 copies in its opening week.

Track listing 
All lyrics written by Jason Pebworth; all music written by George Astasio, Chris Cano, Johnny Lonely, Pebworth, and Kevin Roentgen, except where noted.
 "Radio" - 3:42
 "Ain't No Party" (Astasio, Cano, Lonely, Pebworth, Roentgen, Julian Gallagher, Chad Rachild, Noah Shain) - 3:19
 "Broken Watch" - 3:43
 "The Contortionist" - 4:04
 "Gorgeous" - 3:20
 "Debbie's Gone" - 2:54
 "Where You Are" - 4:07
 "Little Miss Lost & Found" - 4:22
 "Northern Girl" - 3:53
 "Cool Cops" - 4:26
 "Everybody!" - 3:10

Personnel 
 George Astasio - guitars
 Chris Cano - drums
 Johnny Lonely - bass
 Jason Pebworth - vocals
 Kevin Roentgen - guitars

Release history

References 

2007 albums
Orson (band) albums
Mercury Records albums